Two ships of the Royal Navy have borne the name HMS Narborough, after Rear-Admiral Sir John Narborough. A third was planned, but renamed shortly before being launched:

She was sold in 1921.
  was an  launched in 1916 and wrecked in 1918.
  was a  launched in 1943 under lend-lease, and returned to the US Navy in 1946.

Royal Navy ship names